Liberty is an unincorporated community in Red River Parish, Louisiana, United States.

Notes

Populated places in Ark-La-Tex
Unincorporated communities in Louisiana
Unincorporated communities in Red River Parish, Louisiana